A consultant (from  "to deliberate") is a professional (also known as expert, specialist, see variations of meaning below) who provides advice and other purposeful activities in an area of specialization.

Consulting services generally fall under the domain of professional services, as contingent work. A consultant is employed or involved in giving professional advice to the public or to those practicing the profession.

Definition and distinction 
The Harvard Business School provides a more specific definition of a consultant as someone who advises on "how to modify, proceed in, or streamline a given process within a specialized field".

In his book, The Consulting Bible, Alan Weiss defines that "When we [consultants] walk away from a client, the client's conditions should be better than it was before we arrived or we've failed." There is no legal protection given to the job title 'consultant'.

Subject-matter expert (SME) vs. consultant 
According to Institute of Management Consultants USA, "The value of a consultant [as compared to a Subject-matter expert (SME)] is to be able to correctly diagnose and effectively transform an often ill-defined problem and apply information, resources and processes to create a workable and usable solution. Some experts are good consultants and vice versa, some are neither, few are both." Another differentiation would be that a consultant sells advice, whereas an expert sells their expertise. Other differentiations exist for Consultants vs. Coaches or SMEs vs. Team Leaders.

Consultants do not have to be subject-matter experts as consulting agreements are a form of labor contract - comparable to staffing, which a client procures for more generalized labor, whereas consulting is for more specialized labor. Thus, in contrast to advisory services, which is not a labor contract but an actual service (advisory services never become part of the procuring organization) the market for consulting agreements follows the demand for specialized labor in the form of a consulting procurement, and so while competence and experience is naturally an advantage for when looking to sell consulting services, it is not a prerequisite in the same way that it is for advisory services where the service provider per definition relies on some level of competence and experience for its relevance.

Contractor vs. consultant 
Sometimes, the word consultant applies specifically to someone or organization that provides knowledge, advice or service; whereas the contractor builds something for the client.

Consultants' view of a consultant 
A study found that business consultants maintain a very humble approach in their partnership with the client and believe that the ultimate goal is to make the customer move forward. Further, consultants are conscious in amount of control and discretion which comes from the customer and understand that criticism of their role is part of the work and sometimes even justified.

Role of a consultant 
The role of a consultant outside the medical sphere (where the term is used specifically for a grade of doctor) can fall under one of two general categories:
 Internal consultant: someone who is either employed by or contracted by a client organization, and operates within a client-organization (maybe as part of an internal consultancy unit); or
 External consultant: someone who is employed externally to the client (either by a consulting firm, some other agency or as an independent freelancer), whose expertise is provided as part of a contract for a fee or rate.

Business case for hiring a consultant 
Traditionally, through the act of procuring consulting services, clients may acquire access to higher grades of expertise than would be financially feasible for them to retain in-house on a long-term basis. Moreover, clients can control their expenditures on consulting services by only purchasing as much services from the outside consultant as desired. Additionally, consultants are key persons with specific domain-skills in creating strategies, leading change (e.g. digitalization), leadership coaching, interim management (also called consultant manager), etc.

Another business-case is that a consultant may save the company money: for example, a specialist tax-consultant who saves the company 20% on its taxes, and only charges 10% in fees, enables the company to net a 10% savings.  A portion of professional services in demand for clients are simply not necessary to retain in house, as they may be sporadic in nature, at which a consultant offers a reduction in payroll for the client.

In the UK government sector, since 2010 the Cabinet Office has required government departments to implement spending controls which restrict the appointment of consultants and temporary staff in order to regulate consultancy expenditure and ensure that the use of consultants offers value for money. A National Audit Office report published in 2015 recommended that all UK government departments adopt a "strategic plan" to assess their current skills and expected "skill gaps", so that their future need for consultants and temporary staff could be better predicted.

Delivery of service 
Consultants provide their services to their clients in a variety of forms. Reports and presentations are often used. Advice can be general (high degree of quality of communication) and also domain-focused. However, in some specialized fields, the consultant may develop as well as implement customized software or other products for the client. Depending on the nature (also named mandate or statement of work or assignment) of the consulting services and the wishes of the client, the advice from the consultant may be made public, by placing the report or presentation online, or the advice may be kept confidential (under a Non-disclosure agreement or within the clients-company), and only given to the senior executives of the organization.

Employment status and career distinction 
Consultants work for (consulting) firms or as freelance contractors. A consultant differs from a temporary worker insofar as she or he has, as detailed above, a highly specialized career and domain knowledge. This could be true for a temporary worker too, however, for example a medical consultant is unlikely to suddenly become a hotel receptionist, whereas a temporary worker might change domains and branches more frequently. Furthermore, a consultant usually signs a service-type employee contract (known as fixed-term, full-time, part-time), whereas a temporary worker will only be offered a temporary (and scope limited) contract or a work-results type contract (e. g. in Germany a specific type of contract called Werksvertrag) to fulfill or create a specific work. Additionally, a temporary worker might be directed and managed by a client, whereas a consultant is employed by a company (or self) and provides services for a client. The consultant may not be provided work-related instruments or tools, but only the necessary infrastructure and accesses the consultant needs to fulfill the statement of work, e. g. access to internal IT networks or client-side laboratory. Moreover, a consultant might engage in multi-project services (matrix organization) for the client or for internal projects/activities at the employer firm.

The consultant's career path is usually not at the client's side, however the consultant will very likely be introduced into the client's organizational program or project structure.

Novel collaborations of expert-contractors or independent consultants especially in ICT sector exist, e.g. ThoughtWorks.

Consulting scope 
A consultant's activity can last anywhere from an hourly consultation, to a one-day service, three months, 12 months or more. For complex projects, a longer period is needed for the consultant to analyze, resolve the root cause, get to know the stakeholders and organizational-situation, etc. Usually the engagement has set legal boundaries under given law to avoid (specifically for freelance-contractors) the problem of false self-employment (see also Umbrella company). The person at client location is sometimes called a Resident. By spending time at the client's organization, the consultant is able to observe work processes, interview workers, managers, executives, board members, or other individuals, and study how the organization operates to provide hers or his services.

In some settings, a consultant is signing a specific contract and is hired as an interim manager or executive with advanced authority or shared responsibility or decision making of client-side activities, filling a vacant position which could and cannot be filled with an internal candidate. This is often the case by the client-organization due to other constraints, such as corporate compliance and HR-processes, which lead to prolonged hiring paths beyond six months, which is often inacceptable for leadership roles.

Work location 
Research and analysis can occur at the consultants' offices (sometimes called back office) or home-offices or via remote work. In the case of smaller consulting firms, consultants typically work at the site of the client for at least some of the time. The governing factor on where a consultant works tends to be the amount of interaction required with other employees of the client. If a management consultant is providing advice to a software firm that is struggling with employee morale, absenteeism and issues with resignation by managers and senior engineers, the consultant will probably spend a good deal of time at the client's office, interviewing staff, engineers, managers and executives, and observing work processes. On the other hand, a legal consultant asked to provide advice on a specific property law issue might only have a few meetings at the client's office, and conduct the majority of his work at the consultant's office and in legal libraries.

Similarly, the growth of online, highly skilled consultant freelance marketplaces has begun to grow.

Additionally, the COVID-19 pandemic has resulted in an increase in remote work and demand for online-work skills to continue business or operations.

In-house consulting 
Also known as ICUs - Internal Consulting Units, which are departments or specialists groups created by or maintained by usually larger companies for their own consulting service needs along the business chain. ICUs might be internal or own-run businesses.

Success factors of consulting 
The following qualities are found to be helpful for a successful consulting career.

Accenture success factors 
From Accenture blog, one of the main IT consultancies in the world, the following factors play an important role:

 A service-oriented mindset
 Sharing of great work
 Seizing of opportunities
 Setting of goals, seeking of advice and taking time to reflect

Bronnenmayer's success factors 
Bronnenmayer et al. investigated, by applying a structural equation model, and due to little empirical research, the management consulting's success factors from a client perspective. It is found that Consultant Expertise, Intensity of Collaboration and Common Vision have strongest performance impact on success.
 Common Vision
 Intensity of Collaboration
 Trust
 Project Management
 Consultant Expertise
 Provided Resources
 Top Management Support

Sindermann and Sawyer success factors 
Sindermann and Sawyer conclude in their book The Scientist as Consultant, that a [scientific] consultant is successful, if she or he has "achieved a viable mix of technical proficiency and business skills" with "technical proficiency" meaning excellence in competence, credibility, effective networking with colleagues, and ability to negotiate.

Hartel's 10 Golden Rules 
According to management consultant Dirk Hartel, the following ten objectives or rules are key to a successful consulting career:

 Customer first - Especially the meaning of being available (time) for customer needs
 Appearance - Understanding of self-image and dress for the job
 Determined friendliness - Having concrete mindset and goals, but being diplomatic too
 Punctuality - Leading time management, starting and finishing on time, being prepared
 Engagement and productivity - Supporting, being pro-active, etc.
 Critical questioning - Nobody is born a consultant; asking the right questions is a key skill
 Feedback - Request regular feedback, asking for critique rather than waiting for it
 Acceptance of hierarchies - Professional navigation in client organization, knowing authority-levels, being respectful and being confidential with customer information
 Stakeholder behavior - Study and understanding of client behavior and culture; inspiring stakeholders with presentations, etc.
 Being courageous - Consulting-life is challenging, never lose trust in yourself, but also reflect and lead a positive and good life

Consulting challenges

Distinctness 
Consultants are often outsiders to the client organization. On one hand, this means their work methods, expertise, behaviors, etc. differ from the client-employees and organizational, and is exactly what the client needs, however it can also be a considerable disadvantage for a successful engagement and may lead to a less intimate cooperation with the client's business.

Domain 
Next to general challenges, domain-specific challenges for consultants exist. In palliative medicine consulting, emotions, beliefs, sensitive topics, difficulty communicating and prognosis interpretation, or patients expectations despite critical illness are some of the challenges faced by the consultant.

Ethical conflict (manipulation) 
According to Kelman, "One danger is that [the counselor] does not recognize the control that he is exercising over the client's behavior. The other is that he is so convinced that he is doing good for the client that he does not realize the double-edged nature of the control he is exercising." A consultant therefore needs to be aware and in control of her or his manipulative influences in particular counseling settings.

Expectations (customer) 
Hartel mentions several challenges that are based on the types of consultants, including a consultant in a short-term role, as integrator, as driver, as project manager or methodology guru, know-how expert, or as scapegoat.

In case of consultant as integrator, the consultant has the challenging task to resolve, negotiate, facilitate, mediate political situations in companies to move forward, such as different opinions, critical characters (persons), difficult relationships or interfaces, goal conflicts, power games, etc.

In case of consultant as scapegoat, the consultant, who is external to the company, is the one to announce difficult company decisions such as layoffs or reorganizations, but it is important that the consultant acts professional and competent, not just as "Rambo in suit".

Organizational 
Consultants may face several organizational challenges, e. g. internal consultants are faced with the paradoxes to maintain a good balance between knowing the internal company structure and at the same time staying neutral and objective, keeping a marginal position between the client and the provided service. Further, depending on the hiring company's understanding how to work with a consultant, the consultant might be seen as disruption to the inhouse employees status.

Other general challenges 
General issues faced by a consultant can be stress, productivity issues with meetings, general "technostresses", high-paced and changing business environments and situations, etc.

Stakeholder management 
In case of corporate and industrial consultants, the role is further challenged to act and become the "translator of information" from various different client-company cultures and procedures (processes) and between her or his employer-side team, managers and leadership team. What is an important goal to the current client is usually not similar for any other client due to multiple variations in company size, history, product, program, organizational structure, leadership, etc. Hence the consultant must be excellent in sensing and communicating between different layers in the organization and further across it, while maintaining authenticity, integrity and trustworthiness with all parties involved.

Taxation and legal status 
Independent consultants (contractors or freelancer) usually need to fulfil taxation requirements given by laws, specifically challenging employment status to avoid 'disguised' employment.

Compared to contracting, consulting can be seen as being "in business in your own right", not controlled by your client, etc. placing a consultant "well outside" of e. g. IR35.

Alan Weiss provides 20 "factors" for consultants in the US (IRS), which are similar in other countries, to avoid or understand in terms of their business activity. Amongst those, the consultant is not supposed to be instructed by the client, should not receive similar training as employees, has the right to sub-contract, should not be integrated into the organizational structure, etc. to avoid legal-status and taxation issues.

Qualifications
There is no single qualification to becoming a consultant, other than those laid down in relation to medical, psychological and engineering personnel who have attained this level-degree in it or professional licenses, such as Chartered Engineer.

Consultants may hold undergraduate degrees, graduate degrees, professional degrees or professional designations pertaining to their field(s) of expertise. In some fields, a consultant may be required to hold certain professional licenses (e.g., a civil engineer providing consulting on a bridge project may have to be a professional engineer). In other types of consulting, there may be no specific qualification requirements. A legal consultant may have to be a member of the bar or hold a law degree. An accounting consultant may have to have an accounting designation, such as Chartered Accountant status. Some individuals become consultants after a lengthy and distinguished career as an executive or political leader or employee, so their lengthy and exposed experience may be their main asset.

Accreditation 
Various accreditation bodies for consultants exist today:
 AACSB - Association to Advance Collegiate Schools of Business
AMBA - Association of MBAs
CIMC - Chartered Institute of Management Consultants (US)
CMI - Chartered Management Institute (UK)
IC - Institute of Consulting (UK)
EFMD - European Foundation for Management Development (EQUIS)
FEANI - European federation of professional engineers
Institute of Management Consultants (IMC USA)
 International Federation of Consulting Engineers (FIDIC)
The International Council of Management Consulting Institutes (ICMCI)

 The Chartered Institute of Legal Executives - (CILEX), UK.

 The Institute of Commercial Management - (ICM), UK.

Code of Ethics
Accredited practitioners in all fields (incl. medical) can be bound by a Code of Ethics or Code of Conduct.

Ethics in the field of business consulting and organizations is still a subject under research.

A thorough discussion of ethics in the field of consultation is given in Lippitt & Lippitt (see also 2nd edition in English). Here the authors mention several guidelines and definitions including Shay, the Association of Consulting Management Engineers (1966), American Society for Training and Development (1977), Academy of Management (1976) and conclude their own codex with the following attributes (see below). Additionally, the authors mention the difficulty in applying the codex and scenarios of how to track adherence and how to judge violations in accordance with other bodies, such as APA (American Psychological Association) and CSPEC (or CSCE) (Committee on Scientific and Professional Ethics) and conclude that "The most important aspect in the formulation of a code of conduct however, is the recognition of a fundamental moral standard. Only then is compliance with the rules guaranteed."

Consulting domains 
There exist various forms, types and areas or industries of consultants. The following list provides some examples:

Business (general) 
 Franchise consulting
 Human resource consulting - Specialists who provide expertise around employment practice and people management.
 Interim management - Often independent consultants who act as interim executives (any CxO) with decision-making power under corporate policies or statutes. They may sit on specially constituted boards or committees.
 Performance consulting - Consultants who focus on the execution of an initiative or overall performance of their client.
 Management consulting - Professionals working on the development of and improvement to organizational strategy alongside senior management in many industries. ISO 20700 standard has been available since 2017.
 Market-entry consultant
 Media consultant
 Process consultants - Specialists in the design or improvement of e.g. operational processes in specific sectors, e.g. medical industry
 Statistical consultant
 Tax advisor

Technology 
 Information-technology consulting - Experts in Computer-technology disciplines such as computer hardware, software engineering, or networks.

Construction 
 Elevator consultant

Entertainment 
 Creative consultant
 Image consulting
 Theatre consultant

Health 
 Biotechnology consulting
 Consultant (medical) - the most senior grade of hospital doctor in the United Kingdom.
 Consultant pharmacist
 Consulting psychology
 Lactation consultant

Law and politics 
 Economic analyst
 Employment consultant
 Environmental consulting
 Foreclosure consultant
 Immigration consultants - Help with the legal procedures of immigration from one country to another.
 Legal nurse consultant
 Political consulting
 Trial consulting

Education 
 Educational consultants - Assist students or parents in making educational decisions and giving advice in various issues, such as tuition, fees, visas, and enrolling in higher education.
 Faculty consultant

List of notable (management) consultants 
 Alan Weiss (entrepreneur)
 Arthur E. Andersen (Accenture)
 Bill Bain (Bain & Company)
 Edwin G. Booz, James L. Allen, Carl L. Hamilton
 Bruce Henderson (founder of BCG)
 Clay Christensen
 Fred Gluck
 Gary Hamel
George Gallup (Gallup Inc.)
 Henry Mintzberg
James O. McKinsey
 Michael Porter
 Peter Block

Further prominent thinkers are also listed in the Strategy portal.

See also

Business school
Consulting firm
Contingent workforce
Interim management
IRS Reclassification
Knowledge transfer
Management consulting
Permatemp
Political consulting
Project management
Procurement
Public consultation

References

Further reading 
Nissen, Volker, ed. Advances in Consulting Research: Recent Findings and Practical Cases. Cham, Switzerland: Springer International Publishing, 2019. Print.
CMI - Management Consulting Journal
 CMC - Management Consulting Journal
Treichler, Christoph. “Consulting Industry and Market Trends: A Two-Sided View.” Contributions to Management Science. Cham: Springer International Publishing, 2019. 253–272. Print.
 Journal of Business and Management
 Journal of Management Studies
Global business services: obsolete or more relevant than ever? by Stephan Hartmann of Roland Berger Switzerland, 2021
Management Review Quarterly
Marsh, Sheila. The Feminine in Management Consulting. London: Palgrave Macmillan UK, 2009. Print.
McKinsey Quarterly Magazine
Seebacher, Uwe G. Template-Based Management: A Guide for an Efficient and Impactful Professional Practice. Cham: Springer International Publishing, 2021. Print.
Strategy+business by PwC
Roland Berger's Think:Act Magazine
Susskind, Richard, and Daniel Susskind. The Future of the Professions: How Technology Will Transform the Work of Human Experts. Oxford University Press, 2015. Print.
Kipping, Matthias, and Timothy Clark, eds. The Oxford Handbook of Management Consulting. London, England: Oxford University Press, 2013. Print.
TCS' Management Journal Perspectives
Weiss, A. (2016). Million dollar consulting: The professional's guide to growing a practice, fifth edition (5th ed.). McGraw-Hill Education.

 
Business occupations